The women's 70 kg competition at the 2018 European Judo Championships was held on 27 April at the Expo Tel Aviv.

Results

Finals

Repechage

Pool A

Pool B

Pool C

Pool D

References

External links
 

W70
European Judo Championships Women's Middleweight
European W70